Potanthus pallida, commonly known as the pallid dart or pale dart, is a butterfly belonging to the family Hesperiidae found in India.

References

Potanthus
Butterflies of Indochina
Butterflies described in 1932